Huang Han (born June 22, 1966) is a Chinese psychologist best known for her participation as a guest on the acclaimed television dating show If You are the One.

Early life and education 
Huang traces her heritage to Anqiu, Shandong, but grew up with her parents in Jiangsu province. She attended Yangzhou High School and Nankai University and later obtained a doctorate in social psychology from Nanjing University.

Her topics of research include gender-based discrimination, reproductive and child-rearing trends, urban-rural sociology, and management psychology.

Career 
She holds positions in the Jiangsu Psychology Association and the administration department of the Jiangsu Party School.

Personal life 
Huang is married to Yuan Jian, an academic. They have a daughter, born in 1997.

References

1966 births
Nankai University alumni
Living people
People from Weifang
Chinese women educators
Chinese women psychologists